The Oyster and the Wind (Portoguese: A Ostra e o Vento) is a 1997 Brazilian drama film directed by Walter Lima Jr., based on the book by Moacir C. Lopes. It premiered at the 54th edition of the Venice Film Festival, where it competed in the main competition.

Cast 
Lima Duarte as José
Leandra Leal as Marcela
Fernando Torres as Daniel
Castrinho as Pepe
Floriano Peixoto as Roberto
Márcio Vito as  Carrera
Débora Bloch as Marcela's mother
Hannah Brauer as  Marcela child

Awards 
1997: Biarritz Film Festival
Best Actress (Leandra Leal) (won)

1997: Venice Film Festival
Golden Lion (Nominee)
CinemAvvenire Award (won)

1998: Fribourg International Film Festival
Don Quixote Award (won)

1998: São Paulo Association of Art Critics Awards
Best Film
Most Promising Actress (Leandra Leal) (won)
Best Cinematography (Pedro Farkas) (won)

References

External links 
 

1997 films
1990s Portuguese-language films
Brazilian drama films
Films directed by Walter Lima Jr.
Best Picture APCA Award winners
1997 drama films
Films scored by Wagner Tiso